The Semiahmoo (Semiahmoo: SEMYOME) are a Coast Salish indigenous people whose homeland is in the Lower Mainland region of southwestern British Columbia, Canada.

History 
The Semiahmoo are more closely related to the Lummi and Samish peoples south of the international border, and to the Lekwammen and T'sou-ke peoples across the Strait of Georgia, than they are to the Halkomelem-speaking Sto:lo of the Fraser Valley and of the Fraser's delta to the north of themselves, the Musqueam.

The peoples of the strait are united by their North Straits Salish language and by their tradition of using an elaborate reef-net system to catch sockeye salmon as they entered Juan de Fuca Strait and the Strait of Georgia from the south, on their migration to spawning grounds in the Fraser River.

Indigenous Peoples of the Americas were very well organized and survived off the lands which were tied to their Hereditary Chief Names.  Each House would have a Hereditary Chief Name and with the out line of their Traditional Territory and Shared Territories.  The House Group was responsible for their Homeland and took care of their own families and communities.  Laws governing what took place on the land were decided by the Hereditary Chief in Meetings.   

Crests or Art presented on poles, Blankets, Designs, and Body Tattoos told stories of Ownership of the Land and Territory from where one belonged.  If you belonged to a certain house, you wore the Crest proudly and displayed who you were for everyone to know.  Each house was responsible for upholding its House name by acting according to the law.  Generosity was the law.  And abundance was gained by work of the land, fishing, harvesting, and hunting freely on one's Traditional Territory, Homelands and shared Territories.  Giving in the feast house was a sign of wealth, hard work and a coordinated effort of all house group members.  

Delgamuukxw is an example of this where Hereditary Chief names are tied to Traditional Territories as since time immemorial.

Society 
Semiahmoo society did not have a formal political structure.  The First Nation was divided into politically and economically independent households.  Each plank house held several families united by bonds of kinship. There were also two classes—an upper and lower—of free men and a class of slaves.  The upper-class free men had inherited privileges. Slaves were primarily war captives or the descendants of war captives.

Post-European contact 
In 1792, Captain George Vancouver explored Semiahmoo and Boundary Bays.  He did not encounter the Semiahmoo but did describe the ruins of a fishing camp on Point Roberts capable of containing at least 400 or 500 Inhabitants.

Shortly before 1850, their neighbours to the north, the Snokomish, were almost entirely wiped out by a smallpox epidemic.  The few survivors joined the Semiahmoo and the Semiahmoo became heirs to the Snokomish territory which encircled Boundary Bay.  After this time, the Semiahmoo made Crescent Beach one of their temporary summer camps.

The Semiahmoo maintained forts for protection against other First Nations and in reaction to the Hudson's Bay Company fort at Fort Langley.  These fell into disrepair following the 1858 establishment of the Colony of British Columbia.  One such fort was discovered in the 1950s on a bluff in Ocean Park.

In 1857, British Royal Engineers established their Camp Semiahmoo which was later used as a base to survey the international border.  Soldiers described the Semiahmoo as "harmless and peaceable." By the 1860s, Roman Catholic missionaries had a successful church among the Semiahmoo and a gold rush poured settlers and miners into the area.  A new trail was built to link Semiahmoo Bay with Fort Langley.  The 1862 Pacific Northwest smallpox epidemic and another epidemic in 1888 resulted in heavy loss of life among the Semiahmoo. Many Semiahmoo worked as loggers or charged tolls for transportation of logs across their land. Reef-netting also became commercialized until a continuous line of traps by Alaska Packers ended their industry in 1892.

Modern era 

The Semiahmoo Reserve was established in 1887. For much of the last half of the 20th century,  or more than half the reserve's area was leased by the band to the Municipality of Surrey for recreational purposes.  This lease ended in 1998 and the band now profits from leases to a variety of organizations and individual residents. Renowned Haida artist Robert Davidson works from a studio on the reserve.

References

Semiahmoo People page, Surrey Museum website

External links 
 Semiahmoofirstnation.org - Official site
 Semiahmoo Wiki - a joint project of Surrey School District, White Rock Museum and Archives and the Semiahmoo First Nation
 First Nation Detail, Indian and Northern Affairs Canada
 The Semiahmoo People - a website based on the unpublished Sociology Anthropology Master's thesis by Surrey resident and teacher Jack Brown

Coast Salish
Lower Mainland
de:Semiahmoo
hr:Semiahmoo